Banca Nuova S.p.A. was an Italian bank headquartered in Palermo, Sicily island. The bank served the island (the region) mostly, with branches in the Calabria region; It was a subsidiary of Banca Popolare di Vicenza (BPVi), in turn owned by Atlante, a banking sector owned bail-out fund from 2016 to mid-2017. In June 2017 the bank was acquired by Intesa Sanpaolo by another government-funded bail-out, and a plan to absorb the bank was announced in October 2017.

History
The predecessors of the bank, [old] Banca Nuova S.p.A. and Banca del Popolo – Banca Popolare (Banca del Popolo S.p.A., located in Trapani), were formed/acquired by Banca Popolare di Vicenza (BPVi) of the northern Italy in 2000. In July 2002 the [old] Banca Nuova was merged into Banca del Popolo, which the legal person of Banca del Popolo was renamed to [newer] Banca Nuova S.p.A., relocating its headquarters from Trapani to Palermo.

[old] Banca Nuova S.p.A. was a new company incorporated on 25 August 2000 in the Province of Treviso, and acquired 20 branches (19 in Calabria region and 1 in Rieti, Lazio region) from Banca Intesa banking group (from its subsidiaries Banca Carime and Cassa di Risparmio di Rieti respectively) on 1 January 2001. In February 2002, it had 30 branches in the aforementioned area, as well as in Sicily Island, where the company was headquartered. The bank started to open branches on its own since 2000.

Banca del Popolo – Banca Popolare (1883–2002)

Banca del Popolo – Banca Popolare S.c. a r.l. was a cooperative bank founded in 1883 in Trapani. In 1996, it was exposed that one of the shareholders of the bank (8% of the share capital),  Vincenzo Piazza, was linked to mafia.

In terms of branches, Banca del Popolo was not part of the top 10 on the island in 1999; However, the bank was a leader (second) inside the Province of Trapani for 12.06% market share in 1997, in terms of deposits.

The majority stake of the bank was acquired by BPVi circa 2000 and a "public offer to acquire" (OPA) The remaining shares were started in late 2000. and completed in February 2001. After the acquisition, the bank was demutualized and became a società per azioni circa 2000-01.

The bank was merged with BPVi's Banca Nuova network in July 2002, the legal person of Banca del Popolo was the surviving entity after the merger, but not the name.

Banca Nuova (2002–2018)
Since the merger of Banca Nuova and Banca del Popolo, the bank has grown its network by acquiring from other banking groups, as well as opening new branches by the bank itself. In 2004, Banca Antoniana Popolare Veneta sold 30 branches to Banca Nuova.

A subsidiary (later sister company), PrestiNuova S.p.A., was found in 2005. The company was specialized in secured loan (by a fifth of salary). , Banca Nuova owned 88.67% shares. The other shareholders at that time were parent company BPVi (6.34%) and fellow Sicilian bank Banca Popolare Sant'Angelo (5%).

On 1 March 2011, the old legal person of Banca Nuova was replaced by another of the same name, the latter was incorporated on 31 August 2010. After the deal, PrestiNuova became a sister company of Banca Nuova, instead of a subsidiary, which BPVi owned 95% and reaching 100% of the shares in 2013.

Banca Nuova and its parent company BPVi suffered from capital shortfall in 2016 (for example, Banca Nuova's CET1 capital ratio was 6.74% at 31 December 2015, barely above the requirement; same condition in the parent company (Group's CET1 ratio was 6.65%)). After the failure of the initial public offering of its shares since it became a società per azioni, the parent company was bail-out by its underwriter Atlante in mid-2016 for about €1.5 billion, which replaced UniCredit as underwriter.

As part of the scandal of the parent company BPVi in 2016–17, the bank was suffered from lawsuit regarding mis-selling of the shares of BPVi to the depositors of the bank, during which the parent company was a cooperative.

After the financial condition of BPVi deteriorated further, it was declared by the European Central Bank (the supervisor of BPVi) that the banking group was insolvent in 2017. An Italian government funded bail-out of the depositors (and bail-in of the investor of BPVi) saw Intesa Sanpaolo, the second largest banking group of Italy by total assets, acquire most of the good assets and liabilities of BPVi, as well as Banca Nuova. However, it was also announced on 26 October, that the bank would be absorbed by Intesa Sanpaolo as branches, losing its brand and the separate incorporated status. The merger plan was approved by the board of directors of Intesa Sanpaolo on 5 February 2018.

A public version of a decision of the Italian Competition Authority, revealed that the bank (as part of BPVi), had a market share in terms of deposits, 5–10% in the Province of Trapani, as well as 0–5% in other 8 provinces of Sicily before the merger; the same decision also revealed that BPVi (through Banca Nuova and sister company) had a market share, in terms of lending to families, 10–20% in the Province of Trapani and 5–10% in the Provinces of Agrigento, Caltanissetta, Enna, Messina, Palermo and 0–5% in the Provinces of Catania, Ragusa and Syracuse (Siracusa).

On 11 July 2017 it was also announced that Banca Nuova had sold back some of the non-performing loans back to BPVi which now acted as a bad bank.

Sister companies

PrestiNuova
PrestiNuova was a subsidiary of Banca Nuova but later a sister company. It specialized in consumer loan. , the company had a CET1 capital ratio of 10.09%, total assets of €354 million and a net equity of €42 million. The remaining 5% shares of PrestiNuova was acquired from Banca Popolare Sant'Angelo in 2013, for about €1.9 million.

FarmaNuova
Banca Nuova also owned 30% shares of associate company FarmaNuova in 2009. The company was dedicated to pharmacies. FarmaNuova was absorbed by sister company FarBanca in 2012.

Sponsorship
The bank was a sponsor of basketball team Pallacanestro Trapani, football clubs U.S. Città di Palermo and Trapani Calcio (until the 2015–16 season).

See also

other Sicilian banks
 Banco di Sicilia, former subsidiary of UniCredit
 Banco Popolare Siciliano, a brand of Banco Popolare
 Credito Siciliano, a subsidiary of Credito Valtellinese
 Banca Agricola Popolare di Ragusa, a cooperative bank
 Banca Popolare Sant'Angelo, a cooperative bank
other Calabrian bank
 Banca Carime, former subsidiary of UBI Banca

References

External links
  
 Official website of PrestiNuova 

Defunct banks of Italy
Companies based in Palermo
Companies based in Trapani
Intesa Sanpaolo acquisitions
Former Intesa Sanpaolo subsidiaries
Banks established in 1883
1883 establishments in Italy
Banks established in 2002
Italian companies established in 2002
Banks disestablished in 2018
2018 disestablishments in Italy
Banca Popolare di Vicenza
Italian companies established in 1883
Italian companies disestablished in 2018